Udaya Bhanu is an Indian presenter and film actress best known for her works in Telugu television shows.

Early life
Udaya Bhanu was born on August 5th 1972 in Sultanabad, Karimnagar, Telangana, India. Her father S. K. Patel was a doctor and her mother Aruna is an Ayurvedic doctor. She has one brother. Her father also worked as a poet. Udaya Bhanu was named after his pen name. He died when  Bhanu was four years old.

Career
Bhanu made her acting debut in R. Narayana Murthy's Erra Sainyam (1994), when she was at age 22 years. She appeared in few more Telugu films, including Kondaveeti Simhasanam (2002), Qaidi Brothers (2002) and Shravana Masam (2005). She also played lead roles in a couple of Kannada films and has acted in an unreleased Tamil film Chinna Ramasamy Periya Ramasamy co-starring Jayaram by R. V. Udayakumar. She performed item numbers in three Telugu films Aapada Mokkula Vaadu (2008), Leader (2010) and Julai (2012).

Filmography

Television career

As host
Horlicks Hrudayanjali for ETV Telugu
Once More Please for Gemini TV
Sahasam cheyara Dimbaka for Gemini TV
Janavule Nerajanavule for Gemini TV
Nuvvu Nenu for Gemini TV
Lux Dream girl for Gemini TV
Chaangure Bangaru lady for Gemini TV
Lucky Lakshmi for Gemini TV
Dancing stars for Gemini TV
Gold Rush (season 1) for Zee Telugu
Teenmaar for Zee Telugu
Magadheera for Zee Telugu
Rela Re Rela for MAA TV
Rangam (season 1&2) for MAA TV
Dhee (1 to 6 seasons) for ETV Telugu
Pillalu Pidugulu for Gemini TV
Antahpuram for Gemini TV
Neethone Dance for Star Maa
Kalyana Lakshmi for Gemini TV
Gang leader for ETV Plus
Bomma Borusaa for Gemini TV (present)

As Judge
Adhurs for ETV Telugu
Thadakha for ETV Telugu
Joolakataka for Gemini TV
DHEE for ETV Telugu

Awards
Golden lady of TV Award in Zee Telugu Apsara Awards 2017

References

External links
 

Living people
Indian film actresses
Indian women television presenters
Indian television presenters
People from Karimnagar
20th-century Indian actresses
21st-century Indian actresses
Telugu television anchors
Telugu actresses
1970 births
Actresses from Telangana